Campomanesia hirsuta is a species of plant in the family Myrtaceae. The plant is endemic to the Atlantic Forest ecoregion of southeastern Brazil, within Rio de Janeiro state. It is an IUCN Red List Endangered species, threatened by habitat loss.

References

IUCN Red List of all Threatened Species. 

hirsuta
Endemic flora of Brazil
Flora of the Atlantic Forest
Flora of Rio de Janeiro (state)
Endangered flora of South America
Taxonomy articles created by Polbot